The 1981 San Jose Earthquakes season was the eighth for the franchise in the North American Soccer League.  They finished in fourth place in
the Western Division.

Squad
The 1981 squad

Competitions

NASL

Match results

Season 

* = ShootoutSource:

Standings

References

External links
The Year in American Soccer – 1981 | NASL
San Jose Earthquakes Game Results | Soccerstats.us
San Jose Earthquakes Rosters | nasljerseys.com

San Jose Earthquakes seasons
San Jose
San Jose
1981 in sports in California